Bob Flett (3 March 1914 – 26 November 1999) was an  Australian rules footballer who played with St Kilda in the Victorian Football League (VFL).

Notes

External links 

1914 births
1999 deaths
Australian rules footballers from Victoria (Australia)
St Kilda Football Club players
Brunswick Football Club players